Charissa pullata is a moth of the family Geometridae. It is found in Spain, France, Belgium, Germany, Switzerland, Italy (including Sicily), Slovenia, Austria, the Czech Republic, Poland, Slovakia, Hungary, Romania, Serbia and Montenegro, Bulgaria, North Macedonia, Albania and Greece.

The wingspan is about 30 mm. Adults are on wing from the beginning of June to mid August in one generation per year.

The larvae feed on Asplenium ruta-muraria, Lonicera xylosteum, Rubus idaeus, Sarothamnus scoparius and Thymus pulegioides. They overwinter in the larval stage.

Subspecies
Charissa pullata pullata
Charissa pullata albarinata Milliere, 1859
Charissa pullata impectinata Guenee, 1858
Charissa pullata kovacsi Vojnits, 1967

References

External links

Lepiforum.de

Gnophini
Moths of Europe
Taxa named by Michael Denis
Taxa named by Ignaz Schiffermüller